The Julius Nyerere International Convention Centre (JNICC) is a convention centre located in Dar es Salaam, Tanzania. It is named after Julius Nyerere, Tanzania's first president.

References

Convention centres in Tanzania
C
Buildings and structures in Dar es Salaam
Tourist attractions in Dar es Salaam